The following is a list of the volumes in the Slayers series of comedic fantasy light novels written by Japanese author Hajime Kanzaka and illustrated by Rui Araizumi. Most of them were first serialized in Dragon Magazine, with the first beginning in 1989, before being collected into books by Fujimi Fantasia Bunko. Following several years that saw no new volumes having been released after 2011, the series resumed in 2018. The first eight novels were published in English by Tokyopop during the 2000s. J-Novel Club licensed the series for English publication in 2020 and released the novels digitally before printing them in 3-1 omnibus hardcover books.

Slayers

Slayers Special

Slayers Delicious

Slayers Smash.

References

External links
 

Light novels
Slayers